The Amoycan Industrial Centre fire began on 21 June 2016 in a self-storage facility housed in an industrial building in Ngau Tau Kok, Kowloon, Hong Kong. The fire was Hong Kong's longest-burning in two decades, and claimed the lives of two firemen.

Site
The Amoycan Industrial Centre Block No.1 is a 66-year old (as of 2016) multi-storey flatted factory building. Developed by Amoy Canning, the block's present-day owner is Hang Lung Group, a local developer that acquired the property investment arm of Amoy Food. At the time of the fire it housed several tenants including small factories, a church, and SC Storage, a mini-warehouse self-storage facility where the fire began. Owing to the building's age, it was legally exempt from installing a sprinkler system.

Fire
The fire originated in the third floor of the building at SC Storage at 11:00 am on 21 June 2016. It was upgraded to a three alarm fire at 12:14 pm before being further upgraded to a four alarm at 7:46 pm.

It burned for 108 hours.

Casualties
Thomas Cheung Yiu-sing, 30, a senior officer attached to the Fire and Ambulance Services Academy in Tseung Kwan O, was part of the first breathing apparatus team to enter. The inferno suddenly intensified and Cheung was lost in the smoke. He was rescued and rushed to United Christian Hospital, where he was certified dead at 9:54 pm.

Senior fireman Samuel Hui Chi-kit, 37, of Kwun Tong Fire Station, died in hospital on 23 June.

Structural safety
During the fire large cracks appeared in the building. A group of engineers spoke out urging the cessation of efforts to save the property inside, instead advocating a controlled demolition of the building for the sake of safety. Experts suggested that the steel reinforcement within the ceiling and walls of the third floor had weakened, and that the ceiling was liable to collapse, which would lead to a "domino effect" causing a catastrophic structural failure.

Secretary for Security Lai Tung-kwok said that halting efforts to extinguish the fire would not be a responsible option.

Air quality
The Clean Air Network, a non-governmental organisation that advocates better air quality in Hong Kong, reported that the air around the fire was up to 80 times more harmful to health than the World Health Organization standard. Lawmaker Wu Chi-wai called on the government to open the holiday camps and provide transport so that nearby residents of Ngau Tau Kok and Telford Gardens could choose to sojourn there.

References

Fires in Hong Kong
Ngau Tau Kok